New York City's 27th City Council district is one of 51 districts in the New York City Council. It is currently represented by Democrat Nantasha Williams.

Geography
District 27 is based in the predominantly Black neighborhoods of southeastern Queens, including St. Albans, Cambria Heights, and parts of Jamaica, Hollis, Springfield Gardens, and Queens Village.

The district overlaps with Queens Community Boards 12 and 13, and is contained entirely within New York's 5th congressional district. It also overlaps with the 10th, 11th, and 14th districts of the New York State Senate, and with the 24th, 29th, 32nd, and 33rd districts of the New York State Assembly.

Recent election results

2021
In 2019, voters in New York City approved Ballot Question 1, which implemented ranked-choice voting in all local elections. Under the new system, voters have the option to rank up to five candidates for every local office. Voters whose first-choice candidates fare poorly will have their votes redistributed to other candidates in their ranking until one candidate surpasses the 50 percent threshold. If one candidate surpasses 50 percent in first-choice votes, then ranked-choice tabulations will not occur.

2017

2013

References

New York City Council districts